Seether is a South African rock band.

Seether may refer to:

"Seether" (song), a 1994 single by Veruca Salt
Seether, character in video game Wing Commander IV: The Price of Freedom

See also
Sita (disambiguation)